The 2017–18 New Mexico Lobos men's basketball team represented the University of New Mexico during the 2017–18 NCAA Division I men's basketball season. The Lobos were led by first-year head coach Paul Weir. They played their home games at Dreamstyle Arena, more commonly known as The Pit, in Albuquerque, New Mexico as members of the Mountain West Conference. They finished the season 19–15, 12–6 in Mountain West play to finish in third place. They defeated Wyoming and Utah State to advance to the championship game of the Mountain West tournament where they lost to San Diego State.

Previous season
The Lobos finished the season 17–14, 10–8 in Mountain West play to finish in fifth place. They lost in the quarterfinals of the Mountain West tournament to Fresno State. On March 31, head coach Craig Neal was fired from the program.

Offseason

Departures

Incoming transfers

2017 recruiting class

2018 Recruiting class

Preseason
In a vote by conference media at the Mountain West media day, the Lobos were picked to finish in ninth place in the Mountain West.

Roster

Schedule and results

|-
!colspan=11 style=| Exhibition

|-
!colspan=9 style=| Non-conference regular season

|-
!colspan=9 style=| Mountain West regular season

|-
!colspan=9 style=| Mountain West tournament

References

New Mexico Lobos men's basketball seasons
New Mexico
2017 in sports in New Mexico
2018 in sports in New Mexico